Diadegma balticum is a wasp first described by Horstmann in 1969. No subspecies are listed.

References

balticum
Insects described in 1969